Belmond Ltd. (formerly Orient-Express Hotels Ltd) is a hospitality and leisure company that operates luxury hotels, train services and river cruises worldwide. In 2015, the company had 35 deluxe hotels, 7 tourist trains, 3 river cruises and restaurants in 22 countries.

History 

The company was founded in 1976 by the American entrepreneur James Sherwood with the acquisition of the Hotel Cipriani in Venice from the Guinness family for £900,000. James Sherwood then bought a number of historic rail cars similar to (but likely separate from) those used on the original Orient Express train, which he restored and used to offer rides from Paris and London to his hotel in Venice to wealthy clients, thus the former name of the company. Much of the history of the company is documented in James Sherwood's memoir  Orient Express: A Personal Journey.

On 10 March 2014, Orient-Express Hotels Ltd was renamed Belmond, and on 1 July 2014, Belmond's holding company was also renamed Belmond Ltd.

In April 2015, Belmond Limited partnered with Irish Rail to launch the luxury train Belmond Grand Hibernian in Ireland. In July 2016, Indian Hotels Company Limited  sold its 5.1% stake in Belmond, retaining only 0.44% of Belmond after the sale.

In December 2018, the company agreed to be acquired by LVMH in a $3.2billion transaction which closed in April 2019, thus delisting the company from the NYSE and making it 100% privately owned. The announcement of the sale led Belmond's share to increase by 40% in a single trading day.

Properties

Hotels

Transportation

Restaurants

See also
Topdeck
Road Scholar

Notes and references

Notes

References

External links 

 
 

Hotel and leisure companies based in London
Companies of Bermuda
Cruise lines
Multinational food companies
Railway companies of Italy
Railway companies of the United Kingdom
Hotel chains in the United Kingdom
Hospitality companies established in 1976
Railway companies established in 1976
1976 establishments in Italy
2019 mergers and acquisitions
LVMH brands